The Natural History Museum of Denmark is a natural history museum located in Copenhagen, Denmark. It was created as a 1 January 2004 merger of Copenhagen's Zoological Museum, Geological Museum, Botanical Museum and Central Library, and Botanical Gardens.  It is affiliated with the University of Copenhagen.

History 

The Natural History Museum of Denmark was established on 1 January 2004 by the merging of four long-standing institutions: the Botanical Garden, the Botanical Museum & Central Library, the Geological Museum, and the Zoological Museum.

The history of the individual departments, which now are part of the united Natural History Museum of Denmark, can be traced back to the 17th century. One historical figure in particular played a crucial role in the creation of the Danish national heritage, namely Ole Worm (1588–1654).

His cabinet of natural curiosities, the Museum Wormianum, formed together with the Royal Danish Cabinet of Curiosities the nucleus of what later would become the Geological Museum and the Zoological Museum. In 1621 Ole Worm also became the director of the Botanical Garden, which at that time had been quite neglected. Here he introduced a large variety of medicinal plants and rare species from abroad.

Today the Natural History Museum of Denmark is organized under the Faculty of Science at the University of Copenhagen.

Collections 

The collections are collected over four centuries. The 14 million objects include skins and hides, skeletons, animals in jars with alcohol, insects on pins, plants on herbarium sheets, fossils, minerals, meteorites and more, from all over the world. Additionally, the living collections of the Botanical Garden number some 10,000 plant species such as orchids, cacti, carnivorous plants and exotic trees.

The collections form the foundations of the museum’s research, teaching and outreach efforts, and for a wide range of international research. As well as being a research tool and outreach resource, the collections are also a link to our cultural heritage: many objects exemplify a preservation technique of a specific era, have inspired classic works of art or tell a story of the era in which they were collected.

Exhibitions 
Today, all exhibitions and public engagement programs are located at the Natural History Museum of Denmark and in the Botanical Garden.

The Zoological Museum was closed in October 2022 as a part of the preparations for a new natural history museum in the Botanical Garden. The Botanical Garden, as well as the current premises of the Natural History Museum of Denmark, will be part of the new natural history museum.

New museum 
In 2025, the Botanical Garden in Copenhagen will house a new national museum of natural history.

Directors 
2004–2007: Henrik Enghoff
2007–2014: Morten Meldgaard
2015: Kurt H. Kjær (interim)
2015: Peter C. Kjærgaard

References

External links
 The Natural History Museum of Denmark 
The Zoological Museum in Copenhagen.
The Botanical Garden in Copenhagen.
University of Copenhagen.

Museums in Copenhagen
2004 establishments in Denmark
Museums established in 2004
Natural history museums in Denmark
University museums in Denmark
University of Copenhagen